The personal is political, also termed The private is political, is a political argument used as a rallying slogan of student movement and second-wave feminism from the late 1960s. In the context of the feminist movement of the 1960s and 1970s, it was a challenge to the nuclear family and family values. The phrase was popularized by the publication of a 1969 essay by feminist Carol Hanisch under the title "The Personal is Political" in 1970, and has been repeatedly described as a defining characterization of second-wave feminism, radical feminism, women's studies, or feminism in general. It has also been used by some women artists as the underlying philosophy for their art practice.

Origin and meaning
The phrase "the personal is political" arose in the student movement and second-wave feminism from the late 1960s. It underscored the connections between personal experience and larger social and political structures. In the context of the feminist movement of the 1960s and 1970s, it was a challenge to the nuclear family and family values.

The idea that women being unhappy in their roles as housewives and mothers in homes was seen as a private issue; however, "the personal is political" emphasizes that women's personal issues (e.g sex, childcare and the idea of women not being content with their lives at home) are all political issues that need political intervention to generate change. Furthermore, the slogan tackles the perception that women enjoy a transcendent identity irrespective of ethnicity, race, class, culture, marital status, sexuality and (dis)ability by encouraging individuals to think about personal experience politically.

The second wave of feminism embraced this slogan as it is the wave that brought feminist issues into a politically activist mindset. Women were leaving their roles at home in pursuit of power over their lives and choices that were not subject to patriarchal traps. This changed the dynamic of families where the men were no longer in complete control of their homes and challenged ideas of the perfect subservient wife and mother.

The phrase was popularized by the publication of a 1969 essay by feminist Carol Hanisch under the title "The Personal is Political" in 1970, but she disavows authorship of the phrase, as she says that "As far as I know, that was done by Notes from the Second Year editors Shulie Firestone and Anne Koedt after Kathie Sarachild brought it to their attention as a possible paper to be printed in that early collection". According to Kerry Burch, Shulamith Firestone, Robin Morgan, and other feminists given credit for originating the phrase have also declined authorship. "Instead," Burch writes, "they cite millions of women in public and private conversations as the phrase's collective authors." Gloria Steinem has likened claiming authorship of the phrase to claiming authorship of "World War II".

The phrase has been repeatedly described as a defining characterization of second-wave feminism, radical feminism, women's studies, or feminism in general.

The Carol Hanisch essay

Carol Hanisch, a member of New York Radical Women and a prominent figure in the Women's Liberation Movement, drafted an article defending the political importance of consciousness-raising groups in February 1969 in Gainesville, Florida. Originally addressed to the women's caucus of the Southern Conference Educational Fund in response to a memo written by SCEF staffer Dorothy Zellner, the paper was first given the title, "Some Thoughts in Response to Dottie [Zellner]'s Thoughts on a Women's Liberation Movement". Hanisch was then a New York City-based staffer of the Fund and was advocating for it to engage in dedicated organizing for women's liberation in the American South. Hanisch sought to rebut the idea that sex, appearance, abortion, childcare, and the division of household labor were merely personal issues without political importance. To confront these and other issues, she urged women to overcome self-blame, discuss their situations amongst each other, and organize collectively against male domination of society. 
In her essay, Hanisch's central argument is that women's "therapy" groups should not be dismissed as "apolitical" or "navel-gazing" as some critics have argued, but instead that they are deeply political as they are discussing issues which affect the lives of women due to the organisation of the system. She takes pains to highlight the fact that these issues should not be seen as problems caused by women's failures or problems with themselves, but rather by an oppressive system, and should be treated as such, even though they may appear purely personal. 
Hanisch does not use the phrase "the personal is political" in the essay, but writes:
One of the first things we discover in these groups is that personal problems are political problems. There are no personal solutions at this time. There is only collective action for a collective solution.
The essay was published under the title, "The Personal Is Political", in Notes from the Second Year: Women's Liberation in 1970. The essay's author believes that Shulamith Firestone and Anne Koedt, the book's editors, gave the essay its famous title. It has since been reprinted in Radical Feminism: A Documentary Reader.

Multiple meanings 
The phrase has adopted a number of meanings since first being coined in the 1960s. Hanisch herself observed in 2006 that "Like most of the theory created by the Pro-Woman Line radical feminists, these ideas have been revised or ripped off or even stood on their head and used against their original, radical intent." This highlights how feminists have interpreted the nature of the connection between the personal and political in divergent ways.

 The interpretation that arose in the second wave of feminism is that the restriction of women to the private sphere is a political issue. The home is seen by some feminists as a site of oppression because women have had little choice but to adhere to the role of housewife and carry out domestic duties. These roles and norms expected of women (such as to be feminine; mothers; supportive wives) are acquired through the process of socialization. For example, young girls are often given babies and cooking sets as toys which teaches them their role is to be a mother and carry out domestic duties. Therefore, according to some feminists, the role of women at home and gender norms highlight the politicisation of the personal because it shows the consequences gender politics and the patriarchal structuring of society has had in women's lives.
 Private, female experiences are often shared. For example, abortion is an issue that has united women from all classes and backgrounds which highlights that their personal experiences can be collective. Personal experiences being shared between women makes them political because they arise from social conditions caused by patriarchy and gender politics. As summarized by Heidi Hartmann, "Women's discontent, radical feminists argued, is not the neurotic lament of the maladjusted, but a response to a social structure in which women are systematically dominated, exploited, and oppressed." So, some feminists call to declare the private as political to erode the boundaries between the two and avoid the oppression of women through ignorance towards their collective experiences.
 Believing politics only occurs in the public sphere excludes personal struggles and marginalises women. Politics is power which takes place in both the private and public sphere because issues that affect the private sphere (such as free contraception; equal pay) are also located in the public sphere. More simply, personal issues are affected by law making and enforcement. For example, due to occurring in the private sphere, the issue of domestic violence was mostly excluded from the public political arena such as legal intervention. There was minimal legal protection for women and domestics were considered as a waste of time for the police which, according to some feminists, shows the interdependence of the personal and political.

Impact 
The phrase has heavily figured in black feminism, such as "A Black Feminist Statement" by the Combahee River Collective, Audre Lorde's essay "The Master's Tools Will Never Dismantle the Master's House", and the anthology This Bridge Called My Back: Writings by Radical Women of Color, edited by Gloria E. Anzaldúa and Cherríe Moraga. More broadly, as Kimberlé Crenshaw observes: "This process of recognizing as social and systemic what was formerly perceived as isolated and individual has also characterized the identity politics of African Americans, other people of color, and gays and lesbians, among others."

Other authors such as Betty Friedan (best known for her book The Feminine Mystique) have also been seen to adapt the political argument: 'The personal is political'. Betty Friedan broke new ground as she explored the idea of women finding personal fulfilment outside of their traditionally seen roles. In addition, Friedan helped further advance the women's rights movement as she was one of the founders of the National Organization for Women. Betty Friedan influenced the author Susan Oliver to write the biography: 'Betty Friedan: The personal is political'. In this, Oliver attempts “to pull Friedan from the shadow of her most famous work and invites us to examine her personal life in order that we may better understand and appreciate 'the impact and influence' of her activities on the women's rights movement”.

The centrality of the "personal is political" to the second-wave feminist movement means that it is the impetus behind many policy and law changes, including the following in England: 
 Legalisation of abortion (1967)
 Access to contraception on the NHS (1961)
 Access to contraception on the NHS regardless of marital status (1967)
 Criminalization of rape in marriage (1991, 2003)
 Married women property act revision (1964)

It also led to many non-state political action, including women's strikes, women's protests (including the famous Miss World protest), Women's Liberation Movement (WLM) conferences, and the setting of women's refuges, rape crisis centres, and women's communes.

Both third-wave feminism and postfeminism hold the argument of "the personal is political" as central to their beliefs, "the second-wave' understanding of 'the personal is political' quickly evolved away from its explanatory and analytical power to become a prescription for feminism living - a shift that ultimately collapsed the terms together." Thus the argument continues to impact modern feminism.

Third-wave feminists tend to focus on 'everyday feminism' for example, combining feminist values and statements with fashion, relationships and reclaiming traditional feminised skills . They increased the importance assigned to such practices and openly declared them to be political. Some believe this is an example of combining the person with the political, however this, like the meaning of the term, is contested. Some second wave feminists believe that declaring personal choices to be political, like whether to wear nail polish, does not focus enough on how political structures shape "the personal". Some feminists argue that viewing the personal as political the way everyday feminists do does not necessarily mean ignoring how second wave feminists used the term, and that both interpretations and applications are compatible.

Art
Artists such as the Australian Ann Newmarch, founding member of the Women's Art Movement in Adelaide in 1976,  used the philosophy to underpin her work, such as in her famous screenprint, Women Hold Up Half the Sky

Criticisms 
Liberal feminists argue that the phrase is dangerous because it erodes necessary political boundaries. This is because it is said to take away the importance of the public aspect of politics. It is further criticised by Hannah Arendt that, in this process of eroding political boundaries, the public space of politics is transformed into a pseudo-space of interaction in which individuals no longer 'act' but merely behave as economic producers and consumers. 

Furthermore, according to some critics, the interpretation of the phrase to be about women being oppressed in the home has a very narrow focus on middle class white women. This excludes women who work, lesbian couples, women who can not afford childcare and the experiences of other cultures.  For example, the 'personal is political' narrative has been shown to be less significant in African culture as black women are less likely to see the home as a source of oppression because it is a source of strength against racism.

See also 
Anti-Oedipus: Capitalism and Schizophrenia

References

1960s neologisms
Feminism
Autonomism
Student protests
Sexual revolution
1970 essays
English phrases
Feminist terminology